Zapatera is a shield volcano located in the southern part of Nicaragua. It forms the island of Isla Zapatera in the Lake Nicaragua. Isla Zapatera constitutes one of 78 protected areas of Nicaragua.

As of 1850, Zapatera was described "uninhabited" by British writer John Baily. The archaeological site of Zapatera is located on the island.

See also
 List of volcanoes in Nicaragua

References 

Mountains of Nicaragua
Shield volcanoes of Nicaragua
Lake islands of Nicaragua
National parks of Nicaragua
Lake Nicaragua
Polygenetic shield volcanoes